Skyline Chili is a chain of Cincinnati-style chili restaurants based in Cincinnati, Ohio. Founded in 1949 by Greek immigrant Nicholas Lambrinides, Skyline Chili is named for the view of Cincinnati's skyline that Lambrinides could see from his first restaurant (which has since been demolished), opened in the section of town now known as Price Hill. It is also the "official chili" of many local professional sports teams and venues, including the Cincinnati Reds, Cincinnati Cyclones, Columbus Blue Jackets and the Kings Island theme park, and also sponsors the Crosstown Shootout, an annual men's college basketball rivalry game between the city's two NCAA Division I teams, Cincinnati and Xavier.

History 
In 1912, Nicholas Lambrinides emigrated to Cincinnati from Kastoria, Greece, and brought his favorite family recipes with him. To save up the money to bring his wife to America as well, he first worked as a cook for a railroad crew and in a hotel kitchen, then opened a short-order diner. After nearly a decade, his wife was able to join him in Cincinnati and they raised five sons.

By World War II, Lambrinides was working as a chef for the original Empress Chili restaurant, where he continued to tinker with a recipe which he had been developing for years. In 1949, he and three of his sons opened their own place on Glenway Avenue, near the top of a steep hill (Price Hill).  That diner was located at 3822 Glenway Avenue, at the intersection of what is now Quebec and Glenway Avenue. The owners named it Skyline Chili for its panoramic view of downtown Cincinnati. After some local resistance in the predominantly Roman Catholic neighborhood, Skyline developed a large and devoted following—especially on Thursdays and Saturdays, which immediately preceded and succeeded meatless Fridays.

The family opened a second restaurant in 1953 and the growth of the business accelerated in the 1960s; by the end of the century, there were 110 Skyline restaurants, mostly in Ohio, but with additional establishments in other states including Kentucky, Indiana, and Florida. Lambrinides died in 1962 at the age of 82, but his sons continued to operate and expand the company. They have kept Nicholas's original recipe unchanged since then. According to William Lambrinides, "Dad always said, 'Don't change a thing with the recipe—don't add anything, don't take out anything, it's perfect the way it is'." As a result, Skyline's version has become nearly synonymous with Cincinnati chili. In 1998, the company was sold to Fleet Equity Partners, a New England investment firm, which promised not to change the recipe (which they reportedly keep locked in a safe).

In 2007, the company's board of directors purchased a majority of the Skyline stock previously owned by Chicago-based Prudential Capital Group.

Fare
Skyline Chili is unique in that it is not chili con carne, the meat dish that originated in (and is the state dish of) Texas. Instead, Cincinnati chili is a sauce usually used over spaghetti or hot dogs, containing a unique spice blend that gives it a very distinct, sweet-and-savory taste. Officially, the recipe for Skyline Chili is a well-kept family secret among Lambrinides' surviving children, and the recipe is kept in a bank vault.

Skyline's menu includes their signature dishes: cheese coneys (a hot dog topped with Skyline Chili, mustard, onions, and cheese), and 3-ways (spaghetti topped with Skyline Chili and cheese); 4-ways (choice of beans or onions added), and 5-ways (beans and onions both added). Additional menu items are also purveyed. Skyline's chili, canned chili sauce and frozen microwave meals are also provided in supermarkets, notably at fellow Cincinnati-based Kroger.

Locations 
As of August 2021, Skyline Chili operates 160 restaurants in Ohio (primarily serving Cincinnati, Dayton, and Columbus), Indiana, Kentucky (primarily Lexington, Louisville and the Northern Kentucky suburbs of Cincinnati), and Florida. Skyline coneys are also served inside Goodyear Ballpark, the Arizona spring training home of the Reds and Guardians. The restaurants may be considered fast casual. Diners may sit at a booth or table and be served by a waiter, or at many locations, sit at a counter near employees preparing the food. At all restaurants, dishes are assembled at a centrally located service island so diners may watch their food as it is made. Food prepping takes only a few minutes so one often gets their food quickly. Carry-out and drive-through service are also available at most locations.

Previously, Skyline had a location in Pittsburgh briefly in the 1980s. While unsuccessful, Skyline did consider a more aggressive return to the market in the late 1990s. However, Skyline never returned to Western Pennsylvania and has since backed off any expansion plans of any kind for the time being. The chain continues to operate two locations in Greater Cleveland, but is largely absent north of Mansfield.

In popular culture 
Skyline, along with Cincinnati chili in general, was considered one of the signature dishes for Cincinnati, by the website Only In Your State.

Skyline has been referenced in the YouTube series Pittsburgh Dad in multiple episodes (albeit negatively), with the character of Pittsburgh Dad poking fun at Cincinnatians fascination with the chain and even trying it on a road trip to Cincinnati, passing it in favor of plain spaghetti noodles with french fries, in reference to Pittsburgh-based Primanti Bros.

Skyline was referenced by country music duo Big & Rich in the song "Comin' To Your City" in 2005.

The Clifton location of Skyline Chili was featured in a 2020 episode of The Simpsons titled "The Road to Cincinnati".

The September 8, 2021 episode of AEW Dynamite, which took place in Cincinnati at Fifth Third Arena, saw MJF diss Skyline Chili to the fans as a form of cheap heat before being interrupted by Cincinnati native Brian Pillman Jr. (Veteran professional wrestling personality Jim Cornette, a native of Louisville where Skyline has locations, agreed with MJF on his weekly podcast.) However, Pillman and fellow Cincinnati native Jon Moxley sang Skyline's jingle for the live crowd after All Elite Wrestling finished taping Dynamite and AEW Rampage. AEW broadcaster Jim Ross is also a fan of Skyline Chili and has mentioned them in connection to Cincinnati numerous times on AEW programming.

In 1989 NBC affiliate WLWT in Cincinnati did a story on native Cincinnatians visiting a Skyline Chili location in Fort Lauderdale, Florida while they were in town to root for the Cincinnati Bengals in Super Bowl XXIII, which was being played in the area at Joe Robbie Stadium. WLWT later uploaded the archived clip on their YouTube page in 2022 when the Bengals advanced to Super Bowl LVI, though ironically rival Gold Star Chili is the "official chili" of the Bengals.

References

External links 
 

Fast-food chains of the United States
Regional restaurant chains in the United States
Hot dog restaurants in the United States
Chili con carne restaurants
Companies based in Cincinnati
Restaurants in Cincinnati
Restaurants established in 1949
1949 establishments in Ohio
Fairfield, Ohio
Cuisine of Cincinnati